Lists of ships include:

Lists of commercial vessels
 Lists of cargo ships
 List of civilian nuclear ships
 List of classic vessels
 List of cruise ships
 Lists of Empire ships
 List of largest ferries of Europe
 List of gas carriers
 List of icebreakers
 Lists of Liberty ships
 List of lightvessels
 List of ocean liners
 List of research vessels by country
 List of river cruise ships
 List of slave ships
 List of Sydney Harbour ferries
 List of tankers
 Canadian Merchant Navy#Fleet

Lists of companies
 Canada Steamship Lines#CSL fleet
 List of ships of CP Ships (Canadian Pacific)
 Clan Line#Ships of the Clan Line
 List of ships built by Harland and Wolff
 List of ships built at Hietalahti shipyard
 List of ships of the Illawarra Steam Navigation Company
 List of ships built by John Brown & Company
 List of LB&SCR ships
 List of London and North Western Railway ships
 List of P&O Ferries ships
 Merchant Navy (United Kingdom)#British shipping companies
 Transdev Sydney Ferries#Fleet

Lists of fictional ships
 List of fictional ships

Lists of naval ships

By type
 List of aircraft carriers
 List of battleships
 List of cruisers

By country
 Algeria: List of Algerian ships
 Canada: 
 List of ships of the Royal Canadian Navy
 List of current ships of the Royal Canadian Navy
 China: List of ships of the People's Liberation Army Navy
 Egypt: List of ships of the Egyptian Navy
 Finland:
 List of decommissioned ships of the Finnish Navy
 List of active Finnish Navy ships 
 Germany: 
 List of naval ships of Germany
 List of ships of the Imperial German Navy
 List of Kriegsmarine ships
 List of German Federal Navy ships
 List of German Navy ships
 List of German Navy ship classes
 List of U-boats of Germany
 List of battleships of Germany
 Greece: List of Greek ships
 India:
 List of ships of the Indian Navy
 List of active Indian Navy ships
 Israel: List of ships of the Israeli Navy
 Japan: List of ships of the Imperial Japanese Navy
 Mexico: List of ships of the Mexican Navy
 New Zealand: List of ships of the Royal New Zealand Navy
 Ottoman Empire:
 List of sailing ships of the Ottoman Empire
 List of battleships of the Ottoman Empire
 Peru: List of Peruvian Navy ships
 Portugal: List of ships of the Portuguese Navy
 South Africa: List of decommissioned ships of the South African Navy
 Sri Lanka: List of Sri Lanka Navy active ships
 Taiwan: List of Republic of China Navy ships
 Turkey: Lists of ships of the Turkish Navy
 United Kingdom: 
 List of active Royal Navy ships
 List of ship names of the Royal Navy
 List of early warships of the English navy
 List of warships of the Scots Navy
 United States: List of United States Navy ships

By era
 List of surviving ancient ships
 List of ships captured in the 18th century
 List of ships captured in the 19th century
 List of ships of World War II

Lists using superlatives
 List of large sailing vessels
 List of large sailing yachts
 List of largest container ships
 List of largest cruise ships
 List of largest ships by gross tonnage
 List of the largest ships hit by U-boats in World War I
 List of longest naval ships
 List of longest ships
 List of longest wooden ships
 List of oldest surviving ships
 Timeline of largest passenger ships

Lists of sailing ships
 List of clipper ships
 List of early warships of the English navy
 List of sail frigates of France
 List of large sailing vessels
 List of large sailing yachts
 List of schooners
 List of sailing frigates of the United States Navy
 List of sloops of war of the United States Navy
 List of ships of the line of the United States Navy
 List of ships of the Confederate States Navy
 List of ships of the line of the Royal Navy

Lists of shipwrecks
 Lists of shipwrecks
 List of ships sunk by icebergs
 List of ships sunk by missiles
 List of ships sunk by submarines by death toll
 List of missing ships

Lists of museum ships
List of museum ships

Lists of ships by name

See also

List of countries by level of military equipment
 :Category:Lists of ship launches
 :Category:Lists of ship commissionings
 :Category:Lists of ship decommissionings
 :Category:Lists of shipwrecks by year